Malto  or Paharia  or, rarely, archaically, Rajmahali is a Northern Dravidian language spoken primarily in East India.

Varieties 
There are two varieties of Malto that are sometimes regarded as separate languages, Kumarbhag Paharia (Devanagari: कुमारभाग पहाड़िया) and Sauria Paharia (Devanagari: सौरिया पहाड़िया). The former is spoken in the Jharkhand and West Bengal states of India, and tiny pockets of Odisha state, and the latter in the West Bengal, Jharkhand, and Bihar states of India. The lexical similarity between the two is estimated to be 80%.

Mal Paharia language may have a Malto-based substrate.

The 2001 census found 224,926 speakers of Malto, of which 83,050 were labelled as speaking Pahariya, and 141,876 spoke other mother tongues (dialects).

Phonology 
Malto has a typical Dravidian vowel system of 10 vowels: /a, e, i, o, u/ and their lengthened forms. Malto also does not have any vowel clusters or diphthongs.

 Das (1973: 14) reports the /ʁ/ as a uvular stop.

Grammar
The general grammar of the language is not dissimilar from that of the surrounding communities. One interesting aspect of their culture influencing the syntax of the language is present in its assignment of gender to nouns.

Gender
The gender of words in the Malto language is classified as either being masculine, feminine, or neutral. The masculine form is present when denoting anything related to man or vicious deities. Likewise the feminine form is present for nouns denoting women, the Supreme Being, and minor deities. Although the colloquial term for father 'abba' is a traditionally feminine noun, it is meant to show respect. Coupled with the Supreme Being also being feminine, the respect for the women of the community is evident through their grammar. Otherwise nouns are referred to with neutral gender, which by far makes it the most popular form.

Writing system
Seeing as how the literacy rates amongst the Malto people is very low, it makes sense that the language is not a traditionally written language.  When the language had first been memorialized in writing (by Ernest Droese in 1884) it shared the Devanagari writing system as with many languages in India.  The written portion of the language being supplemented much later on in its life, gives the effect of Malto remaining authentic through the dialogue of their culture.

References

Bibliography

External links
 About the Malto tribe
 Malto basic lexicon at the Global Lexicostatistical Database
 Endangered Languages Project

Agglutinative languages
Dravidian languages
Languages of Bangladesh
Languages of India
Endangered languages of India